Robert Emory Evans (July 15, 1856 – July 8, 1925) was a Nebraska Republican politician.

Evans was born  in Coalmont, Pennsylvania, in 1856. He attended the Pennsylvania Normal School at Millersville, Pennsylvania, and the Indiana Normal School. He worked as a machinist from 1877 to 1883. He graduated from the law department of the University of Michigan at Ann Arbor, Michigan, in 1886 and was admitted to the bar. He moved to Dakota City, Nebraska, in 1887. Due to his training as a machinist and in the normal schools, he became superintendent of the Winnebago Industrial School from 1889 to 1891.

In 1895, he became the prosecuting attorney of Dakota County, Nebraska. He soon resigned that post to become the judge of the Nebraska Eighth Judicial District and served from 1895 to 1899. He was a delegate to the 1912 Republican National Convention and became the president of the Nebraska State Bar Association in 1919.

He defeated incumbent Dan V. Stephens to represent the 3rd Congressional District of Nebraska in the Sixty-sixth Congress. He was re-elected for a second term to the Sixty-seventh Congress. He served from March 4, 1919, to March 3, 1923. He lost to Edgar Howard in 1922. He resumed his law practice in Dakota City. He was elected Judge of the Supreme Court from the Third District of Nebraska in 1924. He served until his death on July 8, 1925. He died in Lincoln, Nebraska where he had previously moved to serve on the Supreme Court. He is buried in Graceland Park Cemetery in Sioux City, Iowa.

References

External links
 
 

1856 births
1925 deaths
People from Huntingdon County, Pennsylvania
American people of Welsh descent
Millersville University of Pennsylvania alumni
University of Michigan Law School alumni
People from Dakota City, Nebraska
Justices of the Nebraska Supreme Court
Republican Party members of the United States House of Representatives from Nebraska